SS Batavier V was a steam packet for the Batavier Line that sailed between Rotterdam and London for most of her career. The ship was built in 1897 by the Gourlay Brothers of Dundee. The Dutch ship could carry a limited amount of freight and up to 428 passengers.

During World War I, the Batavier Line attempted to maintain service, but in March 1915, Batavier V was seized as a prize by German submarine  and sailed into Zeebrugge in German-occupied Belgium. The ship was released by a German prize court in September.

Career 
Batavier V and sister ship  were built for William Müller and Company by the Gourlay Brothers of Dundee, Scotland. The ship was launched on 28 November 1902. She could carry a maximum of 428 passengers: 75 in first class, 28 in second, and up to 325 in steerage.

Upon completion in February 1903, she joined Batavier I, and Batavier IV in packet service between Rotterdam and London. In Rotterdam, the ships docked at the Willemsplein; in London, the ships docked at the Customs House and Wool Quays near the Tower Bridge. The Batavier Line service between Rotterdam and London was offered daily except Sundays, with each ship making multiple round trips per week.

After the outbreak of World War I in August 1914, the Batavier Line continued service on the Rotterdam–London route. Batavier V was frequently stopped by German warships, examined and allowed to proceed. On 17 March 1915, however, Batavier V left Rotterdam and proceeded to Hook of Holland, passing there in the early morning hours of 18 March. While the captains of the two vessels argued the legalities of seizing a vessel flagged under a neutral country, lookouts on the submarine spotted another Dutch steamer, Zaanstroom. U-28 left an officer and a sailor on board Batavier V, and proceeded to stop and similarly seize Zaanstroom. U-28 and a pilot boat, W2, led both of the Dutch ships through minefields and into Zeebrugge.

According to Popular Mechanics, one of Batavier Vs passengers was a photographer who was able to snap pictures of the ship's encounter with the U-boat. In April, the International News Service copyrighted eight images from the photographer, and deposited them with the Library of Congress. According to Popular Mechanics, which published one of the photos in its July 1915 edition, the photographs give a sense of the "enormous size and power of the latest German submarines".

At Zeebrugge, Batavier Vs Dutch crew, and all the Dutch citizens, women, and children among the ship's passengers were released; fourteen Belgian men of fighting age and two priests were taken prisoner by the Germans. Batavier Vs cargo of fresh meat and Zaanstrooms  of fresh eggs were confiscated and unloaded by German personnel. The women and children were fed what one woman called "unpalatable black bread" before being sent to Ghent and on to Terneuzen in the Netherlands. The Dutch government requested explanation from Germany over the seizure of the neutral vessels and their cargoes. Batavier V was released by a German prize court in September.

Batavier V resumed Rotterdam–London passenger service after her release from German control at Zeebrugge. On 16 May 1916, while outbound from London for Rotterdam, Batavier V struck a mine near the north buoy at Inner Gabbard. The mine had been recently planted by the German coastal minelaying submarine . According to one witness, the ship's decks were awash within three minutes of the explosion, which blew the rear cargo hold hatch and sent a great deal of cargo flying through the air. Batavier V sank within twenty minutes, taking with her three members of the crew and one American passenger.

Notes

References

Bibliography 
 
 
 

Ships built in Dundee
Passenger ships of the Netherlands
World War I shipwrecks in the North Sea
1902 ships
Maritime incidents in 1916
Ships sunk by mines